Ervin Llani (born 24 April 1983 in Tiranë) is an Albanian retired footballer who last played as a goalkeeper for KF Laçi in the Albanian Superliga.

International career
He made his debut for Albania in a June 2010 friendly match against Andorra in Tirana, coming on as a sub for the last seconds of the match for Isli Hidi. These proved to be his only international moments of fame.

References

External links

 Profile - FSHF

1983 births
Living people
Footballers from Tirana
Albanian footballers
Association football goalkeepers
Albania under-21 international footballers
Besëlidhja Lezhë players
KF Vllaznia Shkodër players
KS Lushnja players
KS Shkumbini Peqin players
KF Laçi players
KF Elbasani players
FK Tomori Berat players
Kategoria Superiore players
Albania international footballers